Content intelligence is a strategy that uses artificial intelligence systems and software to process content data into reliable insights about the effectiveness of a business’ content.

Working principles of Content Intelligence software 

The AI works within a certain framework to edit a behavioral analysis of customers and clients. It should be able to process a large amount of data in order to give the content strategist an idea about:
 Content trends and efficacy
 How clients react to the content (sentiment analysis)
 The voice and style of the content
The use of content intelligence is therefore connected to the science of big data and artificial intelligence.

Content intelligence is often viewed as an asset for creating and maintaining high-quality content for targeted audiences.

Some ways for companies to achieve content intelligence include implementing or integrating AI into their business' CMS (content management system), CRM (customer relationship management), or DAM (digital asset management) technologies. A semantic engine can also be a part of content intelligence software to automatically classify content according to topic or the tags a platform assigns.

Content intelligence software is often sought by marketers, content strategists, UX writers, and product managers.

References 

AI software
Content designers
Content management systems
Marketing software
Product design